Igor Urošević (born 4 April 1992) is a Serbian football forward.

References

External links
 
 Igor Urošević stats at utakmica.rs 
 

1992 births
Living people
Footballers from Belgrade
Association football forwards
Serbian footballers
FK Teleoptik players
FK Donji Srem players
FK Mladost Lučani players
Serbian SuperLiga players